The 2022 European Youth Olympic Winter Festival was held in Vuokatti, Finland, between 20 and 25 March 2022. The festival was postponed from original dates in February to December 2021.  Later it was announced that the games will be moved to 2022 as a result of the COVID-19 pandemic. Vuokatti previously hosted 2001 European Youth Olympic Winter Festival.

Opening ceremony
The Opening Ceremony was held outside Vuokatti Areena. The Flame of Peace was carried to the stage by former biathlete Kaisa Mäkäräinen and former cross-country skier Matti Heikkinen. It was finally lit by young cross country skier Vilma Nissinen.

President of the Republic of Finland Sauli Niinistö gave the opening speech and declared the event opened. Also President of the European Olympic Committees Spyros Capralos and Mayor of Sotkamo Mika Kilpeläinen delivered speeches. The participating countries entered the ceremony in the flag parade. The dance group Kajaani Dance held a performance with the official song of the festival, "Long in to the Night".

Sports
The following competitions took place

Venues

Schedule
The competition schedule for the 2022 European Youth Olympic Winter Festival is as follows:

Note  Boys ice hockey was played between 12 to 17 December 2021.

Participant nations
On 28 February 2022, the IOC further called for Russian and Belarusian athletes not to be allowed to participate. On 2 March 2022, however, in accordance with a recommendation by the International Olympic Committee (IOC), EOC suspended the participation of Belarus and Russia from 2022 European Youth Olympic Winter Festival. Russia and Belarus however participated in boys' ice hockey tournament held in December 2021 and both won medals in it.

Medal table

References

European Youth Olympic Winter Festival
Multi-sport events in Finland
European Youth Winter Olympic Festival
Youth sport in Finland
Sotkamo
European Youth Olympic Winter Festival
European Youth Olympic Winter Festival
Youth Winter Olympic Festival
European Youth Olympic Winter Festival
European Youth Winter Olympic Festival
European Youth Olympic Winter Festival